The president of Turkey, officially the president of the Republic of Türkiye, is the head of state and head of government of Turkey. The president directs the executive branch of the national government and is the commander-in-chief of the Turkish military. The president also heads the National Security Council.

The office of the president of Turkey was established with the proclamation of the Republic of Türkiye on 29 October 1923, with the first president and founder being Mustafa Kemal Atatürk.

To insult the Turkish president is prohibited by Article 299 of the Turkish Penal Code. 

Traditionally, the presidency was mostly a ceremonial position, with real executive authority being exercised by the Prime minister of Turkey. However, constitutional amendments approved in the 2017 constitutional referendum abolished the office of prime minister, and vested the presidency with full executive powers, effective upon the 2018 general election. 

Recep Tayyip Erdoğan is the 12th and current president of Turkey, who has held the office since 28 August 2014. Since 9 July 2018, Erdoğan has served as the first president under the new executive system of government. The president is directly elected by eligible Turkish voters for a five-year term, renewable once.

Qualifications
In order to become the president of Turkey, the candidate must have completed higher education, and be of at least forty years of age. If they are a member of the Turkish Grand National Assembly, they must resign their seat.

In the past, Turkish presidents were required to sever all relations, if any, with their political party. This convention existed to ensure the president's impartiality in presiding over the Turkish constitutional system. However, the presidency's reorientation in 2017 into a chief executive office abolished this convention, given a president's assumption of office as winners of a partisan electoral contest.

Election

After the 2007 constitutional amendment
According to the constitutional amendments approved in the 2007 referendum, the president is elected by the public, among candidates who are at least forty years old, have completed higher education, and are eligible to be elected as a member of the Grand National Assembly. The election of the president must begin at least 30 days before the term of office of the incumbent president expires or 10 days after the presidency falls vacant, and must be completed within 30 days of the beginning of the election.

Before the 2007 constitutional amendment
Before the constitutional amendments approved in the 2007 referendum, the Grand National Assembly would elect one of its members as the President.

Term of office
The president is elected for a term of office of five years and is eligible for one re-election. An exception exists when a president's term ends with a parliamentary decision (i.e., impeachment and removal from office). In this case, the president may be re-elected for an additional term, with the incomplete term not counting against the two-term limit. The term of the incumbent president continues until the president-elect takes office. Before the constitutional amendment approved in the 2007 referendum, the president used to be elected for a single seven-year term.

On assuming office, the president takes the following oath before the Grand National Assembly:

I swear upon my honor and integrity, before the great Turkish Nation, to safeguard the existence and independence of the state, the indivisible integrity of the country and the nation, and the absolute sovereignty of the nation; to remain loyal to the supremacy of law, to the democratic and secular republic, and to Atatürk’s principles and reforms; not to deviate from the ideal according to which everyone is entitled to enjoy human rights and fundamental freedoms under the notion of peace and prosperity in society, national solidarity and justice, and loyalty to the Constitution.

The oath is broadcast live on TBMM-TV regardless of it is a regular business day of the Grand National Assembly.

Duties and responsibilities

The president’s duties are stated in the Articles 104 of the Constitution.
The president shall deliver the opening address of the Grand National Assembly on the first day of the legislative year,
The president may summon the Grand National Assembly to meet, when deemed necessary,
The president may promulgate laws or return laws to the Grand National Assembly to be reconsidered (i.e. veto),
The president shall appeal to the Constitutional Court for the annulment of laws or certain provisions thereof, and the Rules of Procedure of the parliament on the grounds that they are unconstitutional in form or in content,
The president shall appoint and dismiss the Vice President of Turkey and public ministers,
The president serves as Commander-in-Chief of the Turkish Armed Forces, on behalf of the Grand National Assembly, and defend Turkey's sovereignty and territorial integrity,
The president shall appoint high-ranking officers of the Turkish Armed Forces, including the Chief of the Turkish General Staff, and regulate the procedure and principles governing the appointment thereof by executive order,
The president shall appoint ambassadors of Turkey to foreign states, and to receive foreign ambassadors appointed to Turkey,
The president may negotiate, conclude, ratify and promulgate international treaties,
The president may submit legislation regarding amendment of the Constitution of Turkey to a referendum,
The president may commute or pardon criminal sentences imposed on persons, on grounds of chronic illness, disability, or old age,
The president may call new elections to the Grand National Assembly (by ordering its dissolution) and the presidency, thereby relinquishing the term currently being served, 
The president shall deliver a budget proposal to the Grand National Assembly for approval,
The president shall call and preside over the National Security Council of Turkey,
The president may proclaim the state of emergency, subject to the approval of the Grand National Assembly (in a state of emergency, the presidential decree requires parliamentary approval),
The president may sign executive orders, which may not regulate fundamental rights included in Constitution and matters which the Constitution stipulates to be regulated exclusively by statute, or matters explicitly regulated by statute, (The statute prevails in the case of it conflicts with an executive order and the executive order becomes null and void if the parliament enacts a law on the same matter.)
The president appoints the members and the chairman of, and instruct the State Supervisory Council, to carry out inquiries, investigations, and inspections,
The president shall appoint twelve of the fifteen members of the Constitutional Court, one-fourth of the members of the Council of State, the Chief Public Prosecutor and the Deputy Chief Public Prosecutor of the Court of Cassation and four out of 13 members of the Council of Judges and Prosecutors.

The president performs also the duties of selection and appointment, and other duties conferred by the Constitution and statutes.

Accountability and non-accountability

After the 2017 constitutional amendment
2017 constitutional referendum extended the president's accountability beyond impeachment due to high treason. According to the constitutional amendments approved in the referendum, the Grand National Assembly may initiate an investigation of the president, the vice president or any member of the Cabinet upon the proposal of simple majority of its total members, and within a period less than a month, the approval of three-fifths of the total members. The investigation would be carried out by a commission of fifteen members of the Assembly, each nominated by the political parties in proportion to their representation therein. The commission would submit its report indicating the outcome of the investigation to the speaker within two months. If the investigation is not completed within this period, the commission's time renewed for another month. Within ten days of its submission to the speaker, the report would be distributed to all members of the Assembly, and ten days after its distribution, the report would be discussed on the floor. Upon the approval of two-thirds of the total number of the Assembly by secret vote, the person or persons, about whom the investigation was conducted, may be tried before the Constitutional Court. The trial would be finalized within three months, and if not, a one-time additional period of three months shall be granted.

A president about whom an investigation has been initiated may not call for an election. A president who is convicted by the Court would be removed from office.

The provision of this article shall also apply to the offenses for which the president allegedly worked during his term of office.

Before the 2017 constitutional amendment
Before the 2017 constitutional referendum, the president was not accountable for its actions and orders, except for impeachment due to high treason. All presidential decrees, except those which the president is empowered to enact on his own, had to be signed by the prime minister and the minister concerned, in accordance with the provisions of the constitution and other laws. Thus, the prime minister and the concerned ministers were accountable for these decrees, not the president. The decisions and orders signed by the president on his own initiatives may not be appealed to any judicial authority, including the Constitutional Court. The only accountability the president had was impeachment for high treason on the proposal of at least one-third of the total number of the members of the parliament and by the decision of at least three-fourths of the total number of the members.

Acting President

After the 2017 constitutional referendum
According to the constitutional amendments approved in the 2017 referendum, in the event of a temporary absence of the president on account of illness, travel abroad or similar circumstances, the vice president of Turkey serves as Acting President, and exercises the powers of the president until the president comes back. If the office of the presidency becomes vacant for any reason, the presidential election shall be held within forty-five days and in the meantime, the vice president shall act as and exercise the powers of the president until the next president is elected. If one year or less remains for the general election, the parliamentary election will be conducted at the same time. If more than a year remains, the newly elected president will continue to serve until the next general election.

Before the 2017 constitutional referendum
Before the constitutional amendments approved in the 2017 referendum, the speaker of the Grand National Assembly served as Acting President in cases where the presidency is temporarily or permanently vacant and exercises presidential powers until the president returns to duty or the new president is elected within 45 days.

Latest election

See also

 President of Northern Cyprus
 List of presidents of Turkey
 Politics of Turkey
 Official state car
 Presidential Complex – official residence
 Presidential Guard Regiment
 List of cabinets of Turkey

References

External links
President's website

 
Government of Turkey
Heads of state of Turkey
1923 establishments in Turkey